Euphemia Violet Welby, CBE, JP (née Lyon; 28 September 1891 – 6 May 1987) was commissioned as a superintendent in the Women's Royal Naval Service (WRNS) on 12 June 1939. She was appointed Commander of the Order of the British Empire (CBE) on 1 January 1944.

Background
Parents: Admiral Herbert Lyon & Frances Violet Inglis
 1914 –  1916:  Hon. Sec. SS&AFA Devonport (later Hon. Sec. SS/AFA)
 1916 –  1919:  Red Cross Cook, Malta
 1939 –  1945:  WRNS service:
 12 June 1939 – July 1945: Staff of Commander-in-Chief, Plymouth [HMS Drake]

In civilian life, she did social work on committees in Plymouth and became Chairman of the Astor Institute and was a Justice of the Peace in Somerset, England in 1947.

Family
Euphemia Violet Lyon married Richard Martin Welby (1886–1930), a naval officer who rose to the rank of Captain, who was the son of the Rev. Abraham Adlard Welby and Bertha Sobranoa. The couple had four children.

Death
Euphemia Welby died in 1987, aged 95.  She is buried alongside her mother in the graveyard of All Saints' Church, Freshwater.

External links
WRNS Website

1891 births
1987 deaths
Royal Navy officers of World War II
Commanders of the Order of the British Empire
People from Somerset
Women's Royal Naval Service officers
British women in World War II
Place of birth missing